Pertz is a surname. Notable people with the surname include:

 Dorothea Pertz (1859–1939), British botanist
 Georg Heinrich Pertz (1795–1876), German historian

See also
 Rochelle Perts (born 1992), Dutch singer, winner of the talent show X Factor in 2011
 Pert (surname)